Steinkjer Station is a railway station located in the town of Steinkjer in the municipality of Steinkjer in Trøndelag county, Norway.

The station is located on the Nordland Line, serving both local and express trains northbound through Innherred and on to Nordland county, and southbound to the city of Trondheim.  The staffed station sits adjacent to the E6 highway.  The station is at the northern terminus of the Trøndelag Commuter Rail to Trondheim. An hourly service usually runs on this line.

History 

Steinkjer Station was built as part of Hell–Sunnan Line and opened on 15 November 1905 along with the rest of the line north of Verdal.  The original name of the station was Steinkjær but on 5 June 1925, the spelling was changed to the present Steinkjer.

Steinkjer Station was designed by architect Paul Armin Due. He designed a number of other stations built by the Norwegian State Railways, including virtually all stations north of Levanger on Hell–Sunnanbanen and many stations on Bergensbanen, including all those in Hallingdal. The building is on two floors with living quarters for the station master on the second floor. The building was built in Art Nouveau architectural style with marked portals.

References

Railway stations in Steinkjer
Railway stations on the Nordland Line
Railway stations opened in 1905
1905 establishments in Norway
Art Nouveau architecture in Norway
Art Nouveau railway stations